The two-dimensional critical Ising model is the critical limit of the Ising model in two dimensions. It is a two-dimensional conformal field theory whose symmetry algebra is the Virasoro algebra with the central charge . 
Correlation functions of the spin and energy operators are described by the  minimal model. While the minimal model has been exactly solved, see also, e.g., the article on Ising critical exponents, the solution does not cover other observables such as connectivities of clusters.

The minimal model

Space of states and conformal dimensions  

The Kac table of the  minimal model is:

This means that the space of states is generated by three primary states, which correspond to three primary fields or operators:

The decomposition of the space of states into irreducible representations of the product of the left- and right-moving Virasoro algebras is 

where  is the irreducible highest-weight representation of the Virasoro algebra with the conformal dimension .
In particular, the Ising model is diagonal and unitary.

Characters and partition function 

The characters of the three representations of the Virasoro algebra that appear in the space of states are 

The modular S-matrix, i.e. the matrix  such that , is  

The modular invariant partition function is

Fusion rules and operator product expansions 

The fusion rules of the model are 

The fusion rules are invariant under the  symmetry .
The three-point structure constants are 

Knowing the fusion rules and three-point structure constants, it is possible to write operator product expansions, for example

where  are the conformal dimensions of the primary fields, and the omitted terms  are contributions of descendant fields.

Correlation functions on the sphere 

Any one-, two- and three-point function of primary fields is determined by conformal symmetry up to a multiplicative constant. This constant is set to be one for one- and two-point functions by a choice of field normalizations. The only non-trivial dynamical quantities are the three-point structure constants, which were given above in the context of operator product expansions. 

The three non-trivial four-point functions are of the type . Let   be the cross-ratio. 

In this case we write the conformal blocks in the case  only: the general case is obtained by inserting the prefactor , and identifying  with the cross-ratio.

From the representation of the model in terms of Dirac fermions, it is possible to compute correlation functions of any number of spin or energy operators:  

These formulas have generalizations to correlation functions on the torus, which involve theta functions.

Other observables

Disorder operator  

The two-dimensional Ising model is mapped to itself by a high-low temperature duality. The image of the spin operator  under this duality is a disorder operator , which has the same left and right conformal dimensions . Although the disorder operator does not belong to the minimal model, correlation functions involving the disorder operator can be computed exactly, for example 

whereas

Connectivities of clusters 

The Ising model has a description as a random cluster model due to Fortuin and Kasteleyn. In this description, the natural observables are connectivities of clusters, i.e. probabilities that a number of points belong to the same cluster. 
The Ising model can then be viewed as the case  of the -state Potts model, whose parameter  can vary continuously, and is related to the central charge of the Virasoro algebra. 

In the critical limit, connectivities of clusters have the same behaviour under conformal transformations as correlation functions of the spin operator. Nevertheless, connectivities do not coincide with spin correlation functions: for example, the three-point connectivity does not vanish, while . Other combinations of four-point connectivities are not known analytically. In particular they are not related to correlation functions of the minimal model, although they are related to the  limit of spin correlators in the -state Potts model.

References 

Exactly solvable models
Conformal field theory
Lattice models
Spin models
Statistical mechanics